William Foxwist (1610 – 1673?) was a Welsh judge and politician who sat in the House of Commons at various times between 1647 and 1660.

Life
Foxwist was born in 1610 in Caernarvon, Wales, the son of Richard Foxwist of Carnarvon and his wife Ellen Thomas daughter of William Thomas of Aber. He matriculated at Jesus College, Oxford on 25 January 1628 aged 17. He became a barrister, joining Lincoln's Inn in 1636 and being called to the bar in 1645.  He was Recorder of St Albans in 1645.

In 1646, Foxwist became judge of the admiralty for North Wales. In 1647 he was elected Member of Parliament for Carnarvon  until he was excluded under Pride's Purge in 1648. He became Bencher of his Inn in 1649. He was elected MP for Anglesey in 1654 for the First Protectorate Parliament. He became puisne justice of the Brecknock circuit in 1655 and held the post until 1659. He was elected MP for Swansea in 1659.  He became judge advocate of the Chester circuit in 1660 and in the same year was elected MP for St Albans in the Convention Parliament.  He was regarded as a moderate Parliamentarian.

Although the date of his death is unknown, his will was dated 1673 and was proved in the same year.

Foxwist married Mary Pemberton, daughter of John Pemberton of St Albans.

References

 
 

1610 births
1670s deaths
Alumni of Jesus College, Oxford
Welsh barristers
Members of Lincoln's Inn
Members of the Parliament of England (pre-1707) for constituencies in Wales
English MPs 1640–1648
English MPs 1654–1655
English MPs 1659
English MPs 1660
Members of Parliament for Caernarfon
17th-century Welsh lawyers
17th-century Welsh judges